This article presents a list of the historical events and publications of Australian literature during 1999.

Events 

 Murray Bail won the Miles Franklin Award for Eucalyptus
Jan Fullerton was appointed Director General of the National Library of Australia, being the first woman and first internal appointee

Major publications

Novels 

 Thea Astley, Drylands
 Lily Brett, Too Many Men
 Kate Grenville, The Idea of Perfection
 Dorothy Hewett, Neap Tide
 Julia Leigh, The Hunter
 Bruce Pascoe, Shark
 Dorothy Porter, What a Piece of Work
 Matthew Reilly, Ice Station
 Heather Rose, White Heart
 Kim Scott, Benang

Children's and young adult fiction 

 Helen Barnes, Killing Aurora
 Graeme Base, The Worst Band in the Universe
 Kim Caraher, Goanna Anna
 Nick Earls, 48 Shades of Brown
 Christine Harris (author), Foreign Devil
 Sonya Hartnett, Stripes of the Sidestep Wolf
 Victor Kelleher, The Ivory Trail
 Markus Zusak, The Underdog

Poetry 

 Jennifer Maiden, Mines

Drama 

 Van Badham, The Wilderness of Mirrors

Science fiction and fantasy 
 Sara Douglass, Crusader
 Greg Egan, Teranesia

Crime 
 Marshall Browne, The Wooden Leg of Inspector Anders
 Garry Disher, The Dragon Man
 Chris Nyst, Cop This!
 Peter Temple, Shooting Star

Non-fiction 

 Ian McFarlane, Encyclopedia of Australian Rock and Pop
 Drusilla Modjeska, Stravinsky's Lunch
 Les Murray (poet), The Quality of Sprawl
 Anne Summers, Ducks on the Pond: An Autobiography 1945–1976
 David Walker, Anxious Nation: Australia and the Rise of Asia 1850–1939

Awards and honours 

 Michael Fitzgerald Page  "for service to the book publishing industry and to literature as a writer, and through the encouragement and support of upcoming Australian authors"
 Frank John Ford  "for service to the development of the performing arts in South Australia as a director, playwright, administrator and educator"
 Kay Saunders  "for service to Australian history as a scholar, author and commentator on social issues"
 John Antill Millett  "for service to literature as editor of Poetry Australia"

Deaths 
A list, ordered by date of death (and, if the date is either unspecified or repeated, ordered alphabetically by surname) of deaths in 1999 of Australian literary figures, authors of written works or literature-related individuals follows, including year of birth.

 15 February — Gordon Neil Stewart, writer (born 1912)
1 March — Richard Beynon, playwright, actor and television producer (born 1925) 
 20 April — Ric Throssell, diplomat and author whose writings included novels, plays, film and television scripts and memoirs (born 1922)
 8 July — Mavis Thorpe Clark, novelist and writer for children (born 1909)
 12 July — Mungo Ballardie MacCallum, journalist, broadcaster and poet (born 1913)
 9 October — Morris West, novelist and playwright (born 1916)
 16 November — Mal Morgan, poet (born 1936)

See also 

 1999 in Australia
 1999 in literature
 1999 in poetry
 List of years in literature
 List of years in Australian literature

References 

1999 in Australia
Australian literature by year
20th-century Australian literature
1999 in literature